John Mark Windle (born May 21, 1962 in Cookeville, Tennessee) is an American politician and an Independent member of the Tennessee House of Representatives representing District 41 since January 1991. In 2022, Windle filed to run as an independent after serving as a Democratic representative for nearly three decades, but lost re-election to Republican Ed Butler.

Education
Windle earned his BS in finance from the University of Tennessee and his JD from the University of Tennessee College of Law.

Elections
1990s Windle was initially elected in the November 6, 1990 General election and re-elected in the November 3, 1992 and November 8, 1994 elections.
1996 Windle was unopposed for both the 1996 Democratic Primary and the November 5, 1996 General election.
1998 Windle was unopposed for both the August 6, 1998 Democratic Primary, winning with 14,062 votes, and the November 3, 1998 General election, winning with 6,111 votes.
2000 Windle was unopposed for both the August 3, 2000 Democratic Primary, winning with 5,051 votes, and the November 7, 2000 General election, winning with 14,650 votes.
2002 Windle was unopposed for both the August 1, 2002 Democratic Primary, winning with 9,346 votes, and the November 5, 2002 General election, winning with 13,217 votes.
2004 Windle was unopposed for both the August 5, 2004 Democratic Primary, winning with 5,468 votes, and the November 2, 2004 General election, winning with 17,615 votes.
2006 Windle was unopposed for both the August 3, 2006 Democratic Primary, winning with 8,177 votes, and the November 7, 2006 General election, winning with 14,062 votes.
2008 Windle was challenged in the August 7, 2008 Democratic Primary, winning with 4,643 votes (92.3%), and was unopposed for the November 4, 2008 General election, winning with 17,025 votes.
2010 Windle was unopposed for the August 5, 2010 Democratic Primary, winning with 5,875 votes, and won the November 2, 2010 General election with 8,701 votes (64.1%) against Republican nominee Patrick McCurdy.
2012 Windle was unopposed for the August 2, 2012 Democratic Primary, winning with 3,147 votes, and won the November 6, 2012 General election with 12,785 votes (61.7%) against Republican nominee Bobby Stewart.
2014 Windle was unopposed for both the August 7, 2014 Democratic Primary, winning with 5,283 votes, and the November 4, 2014 General election, winning with 9,237 votes.

References

External links
Official page at the Tennessee General Assembly

John Windle at Ballotpedia
John Mark Windle at the National Institute on Money in State Politics

1962 births
Living people
Democratic Party members of the Tennessee House of Representatives
People from Cookeville, Tennessee
People from Livingston, Tennessee
Tennessee lawyers
University of Tennessee alumni
University of Tennessee College of Law alumni
National Guard (United States) officers
21st-century American politicians